Johnny "John" Weber (born 29 November 1972) is a former professional Australian darts player.

Career
In 2011, Weber won his first title by claiming the Victorian Easter Open with a 7–2 victory over Jamie Browne in the final. In 2014 he began playing more in Australian Grand Prix Tour events, winning the Mittagong RSL Open 1, Southern Illawarra Open 1 and Warilla Bowls Club Open. Weber qualified for the Sydney Darts Masters and lost 6–1 to Stephen Bunting in the first round. He took the first five legs against Rob Szabo in the final of the Oceanic Masters and won 8–2. The title earned him a place in the first round of the 2015 World Championship, where he lost 3–1 against Terry Jenkins in the first round.

Weber won three times on the 2015 Australian Grand Prix Pro Tour, as well as losing in five finals to finish second on the Order of Merit. In 2016 he was defeated 6–5 in the final of the Chester Hill Open by Corey Cadby and won the Australian Masters by beating James Bailey.

World Championship results

PDC

 2015: First round (lost to Terry Jenkins 1–3) (sets)

References

1972 births
Living people
Australian darts players
Professional Darts Corporation associate players
Sportspeople from Melbourne